Gastrocopta barbadensis is a species of gastropods belonging to the family Gastrocoptidae.

The species is found in Central America.

References

Gastrocoptidae